Bruno Olbrycht (nom de guerre: Olza; 6 October 1895 – 23 March 1951) was a soldier of the Austro-Hungarian Army and officer (later general) of the Polish Army both in the Second Polish Republic and postwar Poland.  Born on 6 October 1895 in Sanok, Austrian Galicia, Olbrycht fought in Polish Legions in World War I, Polish–Ukrainian War, Polish–Soviet War and the Invasion of Poland.  He died on 23 March 1951 in Kraków.

Biography and military career
Bruno Olbrycht’s father, Piotr Olbrycht was a veterinarian.  As a teenager, he graduated from elementary school in Bochnia and high school in Wadowice, where he joined the Sokol paramilitary organization.  During World War One, Olbrycht served in 3rd Regions Infantry Regiment.  In 1917, he was promoted to captain and planned to study at Jagiellonian University, but instead, he continued to fight the Russians in Eastern Galicia, Bukovina and Volhynia.  After the Battle of Rarańcza, he was interned in a camp at Khust.

In 1919–1920, Olbrycht participated in Polish-Ukrainian War as battalion commandant in 8th Legions Infantry Regiment. In the summer 1920, he fought in Polish-Soviet War in Volhynia and later in Belarus. In October 1920, following order of General Lucjan Żeligowski, he captured Švenčionys (Swieciany) (see Republic of Central Lithuania).

In 1921–1927, Olbrycht commanded 8th Legions Infantry Regiment, which was stationed at Lublin.  On 1 December 1924 he was promoted to Colonel, and in 1927 was moved to 2nd Legions Infantry Division in Kielce.  In 1930–1936, he commanded Center of Infantry Training (Centrum Wyszkolenia Piechoty) in Rembertów, from which he was transferred to 3rd Legions Infantry Division in Zamosc.  On 19 March 1937 Olbrycht was promoted to Generał brygady; in May 1938 he returned to Center of Infantry Training, where he remained until September 1939.

During the Invasion of Poland, Olbrycht was named commandant of 39th Infantry Division, but due to his illness, the division was de facto commanded by Colonel Bronislaw Duch.  Captured by the Wehrmacht on 27 September 1939, Olbrycht was kept at Oflag II-D and Oflag IV-B Koenigstein, where he began publishing a camp newspaper Gazetka Obozowa.  In 1941, as a war invalid, he was transferred to Ujazdowski Hospital in Warsaw, and next year German authorities released him.  Soon after his release, Olbrycht joined the Home Army.  In summer 1944, during Operation Tempest, he commanded Operational Group Cieszyn Silesia.  Arrested by Germans in August 1944, he was freed by the Home Army, and became commandant of 21st Home Army Mountain Infantry Division.

On 14 April 1945, Olbrycht joined Polish People's Army. In June 1945, he was sent to Officer Infantry School Nr. 1, and in late July of that year he was appointed commandant of Department of Officer Infantry and Cavalry at Polish Ministry of National Defence.  On 14 December 1945 he was promoted to Divisional general.  Olbrycht, as commandant of Warsaw Military District, actively fought anti-Communist rebellion (see Cursed soldiers).  From December 1946 to October 1947, he commanded the Center of Infantry Training in Rembertów.  In November 1947 he suffered a stroke, and was released from active duty.  He died after third stroke, on 23 March 1951 in Kraków, and was buried at military section of Powazki Cemetery in Warsaw.

Promotions
 Captain – 1917;
 Podpolkovnik (Sub-colonel) – 3 May 1922;
 Colonel – 1 December 1924;
 Generał brygady – 19 March 1938;
 Divisional general – 1945.

Awards
 Silver Cross of Virtuti Militari;
 Officer’s cross of Order of Polonia Restituta;
 Knight's Cross of Order of Polonia Restituta];
 Order of the Cross of Grunwald;
 Cross of Independence;
 Cross of Valour.

References

Sources

External links

 Bruno Olbrycht at Generals.dk.

1895 births
1951 deaths
People from Sanok
Polish people of German descent
Polish generals
Polish legionnaires (World War I)
Recipients of the Silver Cross of the Virtuti Militari
Recipients of the Cross of Independence
Commanders of the Order of Polonia Restituta
Recipients of the Cross of Valour (Poland)